Anthony Cole may refer to:

Anthony Cole (MP) for Kingston upon Hull (UK Parliament constituency)
Anthony Cole (actor) in Gone in 60 Seconds (1974 film)
Anthony Cole, musician in JJ Grey & MOFRO
Tony Cole, thirteenth Secretary of the Australian Government Department of the Treasury